James Stevenson FRSE (1786–1866) was a Scottish merchant and philanthropist who fathered two Scottish heroines, Flora Stevenson and Louisa Stevenson, the industrialist, James Cochran Stevenson and architect John James Stevenson.

Life

He was born in Paisley on 28 April 1786 the son of James Stevenson (1736–1806) a silk gauze manufacturer, and his wife, Margaret Cochran. He was educated at Paisley Grammar School.

He set up a cotton spinning mill with his older brother, Nathaniel Stevenson (1785-1867), and first Calton then Barrowfield, before going into partnership with the Oswald brothers creating Oswald Stevenson & Co with James Oswald.

The family moved into central Glasgow in 1825, running the firm James Stevenson & Co, cotton brokers, from 104 Hutcheson Street. James inherited the family business on his father's death in 1806.

In 1844 he also became a senior partner at the Jarrow Chemical Works in South Shields: a firm supplying dyes for his cottons.

In 1865 he was elected a Fellow of the Royal Society of Edinburgh. His proposer was James Yong.

He died at home, 13 Randolph Crescent in Edinburgh on 13 June 1866. He is buried in Dean Cemetery in western Edinburgh. The grave lies in the southern section above the south terrace. His wife and daughters lie to his right side. John james lies to his left.

Artistic Recognition

He was portrayed by Norman Macbeth and Thomas Annan photographed the portrait.

Family

He was married to Jane Stewart Shannon (1797-1864) from Greenock. They had ten children: four sons and six daughters.

His brother, Nathaniel Stevenson (1785-1867) was father to James Croesus Stevenson.

Family Tree

References

1786 births
1866 deaths
People from Paisley, Renfrewshire
Scottish merchants
Burials at the Dean Cemetery
Fellows of the Royal Society of Edinburgh
19th-century British businesspeople